Sardar Vallabhbhai Patel Sports Enclave is an under-construction sports enclave being built in Ahmedabad, Gujarat, India. Once the sports enclave is fully built, it will be one of the largest of its kind in India. The project is being jointly executed with the Ahmedabad Urban Development Authority, and the Government of Gujarat. A primary reason for the sports enclave to be built, is so that the Summer Olympic Games, and other major sporting events could be hosted in India in the future.

History
The sports enclave is being constructed in Motera, which is a neighborhood in the northwestern part of Ahmedabad. The Narendra Modi Stadium which is the world's largest stadium, and the largest cricket stadium, will also be located within the Sardar Vallabhbhai Patel Sports Enclave. The bhumi pujan ceremony was performed by the president of India Ram Nath Kovind on February 24, 2021. Many other political dignitaries were present at the event including the home minister of India, Amit Shah, and sports minister of India, Kiren Rijiju. The entire project is expected to cost ₹4,600 crores (US$640 million). The government will be investing ₹3,200 crore (US$450 million) into the project and private players will invest ₹1,400 crore (US$200 million). Along with this sports enclave another sports enclave will be built in Narayanpura. Once both enclaves are complete, all types of sports infrastructure will be present in Ahemdabad, and it will allow the city to host large-scale sporting events as well. The sports enclaves will have a capacity to accommodate up to 3,000 children and up to 250 coaches as well. In the future, the Ahmedabad Bus Rapid Transit System, and Ahmedabad Metro will also be extended to the sports enclaves, so that transportation to and from the enclave will be made easier.

Features
The entire enclave will feature a large number of new venues. Of the new venues to be built most of the venues will be built from scratch.  Along with sporting facilities, other buildings such as hotels, commercial areas, and a residential village for athletes will be built as well. The following venues will be built under the entire Sardar Vallabhbhai Patel Sports Enclave.

Also various sports facilities for other sports like Volleyball Stadium, Skate Park, Boating Center on Bank of Sabarmati River, Rugby Stadium, Aquatic Center etc will also be there in this enclave.

Part of 2036 Summer Olympics Bid
Once the Sardar Vallabhbhai Patel Sports Enclave is complete the Olympics could also be hosted in Ahmedabad in the future. In June 2021, the Ahmedabad Urban Development Authority invited proposals consultants to assess venues and related infrastructure that would be needed to host the Olympics. This move came after the Narendra Modi Stadium was inaugurated and the Sardar Vallabhbhai Patel Sports Enclave was announced to be built. Reports have also suggested that the sports enclave will be a part of a future bid for the 2036 Summer Olympics from Ahemdabad.

References

Sports venues under construction
Sports venues in Ahmedabad